The Madibeng  Local Municipality  is a local municipality in Bojanala Platinum District Municipality, North West Province, South Africa. The seat of local municipality is Brits. The popular tourist area of Hartbeespoort is also located in the municipality.

Main places
The 2001 census divided the municipality into the following main places:

Politics 

The municipal council consists of eighty-two members elected by mixed-member proportional representation. Forty-one councillors are elected by first-past-the-post voting in forty-one wards, while the remaining forty-one are chosen from party lists so that the total number of party representatives is proportional to the number of votes received. In the election of 1 November 2021 the African National Congress (ANC) won a majority of forty-four seats on the council.

The following table shows the results of the election.

References

External links 
 Official site

Local municipalities of the Bojanala Platinum District Municipality